Tropidia, commonly known as crown orchids, is a genus of about thirty species of evergreen terrestrial orchids in the family Orchidaceae. They have thin, wiry stems with two or more tough, pleated leaves with a flowering spike at the top of the stem, bearing crowded flowers. Species in this genus are distributed across the warmer parts of both the Eastern and Western Hemispheres.

Description
Orchids in the genus Tropidia are evergreen, terrestrial, sometimes mycotrophic herbs which form small clumps. They have thin, wiry stems, sometimes with a few branches. The stems have two or more thin, tough, pleated, lance-shaped to egg-shaped leaves. Crowded white, greenish or brown, sometimes resupinate flowers are arranged on the top of the stem and have the sepals and petals free from each other, or with the lateral sepals joined and surrounding the base of the labellum. The labellum is not lobed but has a pouch or spur at its base.

Taxonomy and naming
The genus Tropidia was first formally described in 1833 by John Lindley and the description was published in Edwards's Botanical Register. The name Tropidia is derived from the Ancient Greek word tropidos or tropideion meaning "keel", referring to the boat-shaped labellum of some species in this genus.

Distribution and habitat
Species in the genus Tropidium grow in deep shade in evergreen monsoon forests and are native to China, Japan, the Indian Subcontinent, Indonesia, Indochina, Philippines, New Guinea, Australia, Latin America (from Mexico to Ecuador), the West Indies, Florida, and some Pacific Islands including the Solomons, Fiji, New Caledonia, the Galápagos and Vanuatu.

Species
The following is a list of species of Tropidia recognised by the World Checklist of Selected Plant Families as at October 2018:
 
 Tropidia acuminata Schltr. - New Guinea
 Tropidia angulosa (Lindl.) Blume - Guangxi, Taiwan, Tibet, Yunnan, Bhutan, India, Assam, Bangladesh, Java, Sumatra, Japan, Malaysia, Myanmar, Thailand, Vietnam
 Tropidia angustifolia C.L.Yeh & C.S.Leou - Taiwan
 Tropidia bambusifolia (Thwaites) Trimen - southern India, Sri Lanka, Andaman Islands
 Tropidia connata J.J.Wood & A.L.Lamb - Sabah
 Tropidia corymbioides Schltr. - New Guinea
 Tropidia curculigoides Lindl. - widespread across southern China, the Himalayas, the Andaman Islands, Indochina, much of Indonesia, New Guinea, New Caledonia, and the Northern Territory of Australia
 Tropidia disticha Schltr. - New Guinea, Solomons, Bismarcks
 Tropidia effusa Rchb.f. - Fiji, Samoa
 Tropidia emeishanica K.Y.Lang - Sichuan
 Tropidia formosana Rolfe ex Hemsl.
 Tropidia gracilis Schltr. - New Guinea
 Tropidia hegderaoi S.Misra
 Tropidia janowskyi J.J.Sm. - New Guinea
 Tropidia mindanaensis Ames - Mindanao
 Tropidia mindorensis Ames - Mindoro
 Tropidia multiflora J.J.Sm. - Sumba
 Tropidia multinervis Schltr. - New Guinea
 Tropidia namasiae C.K.Liao, T.P.Lin & M.S.Tang.
 Tropidia nipponica Masam. - Japan, Taiwan, Ryukyu Islands
 Tropidia nipponica var. hachijoensis F.Maek. & Yokota
 Tropidia nipponica var. nipponica
 Tropidia pedunculata Blume - widespread from the western Himalayas to New Guinea, including Indochina, Malaysia, Philippines and much of Indonesia
 Tropidia polystachya (Sw.) Ames - Florida, Mexico, Central America, West Indies (including Bahamas and Cayman Islands), Venezuela, Colombia, Ecuador (including Galápagos)
 Tropidia ramosa J.J.Sm. - New Guinea
 Tropidia reichenbachiana Kraenzl. - Maluku
 Tropidia robinsonii Ames - Luzon
 Tropidia saprophytica J.J.Sm. - Borneo
 Tropidia schlechteriana J.J.Sm. - Maluku
 Tropidia septemnervis (Schauer) Rchb.f. - Philippines
 Tropidia similis Schltr. - New Guinea
 Tropidia somae Hayata - Taiwan, Ryukyu Islands, possibly Philippines
 Tropidia territorialis D.L.Jones & M.A.Clem. - Northern Territory of Australia
 Tropidia triloba J.J.Sm. - New Guinea
 Tropidia viridifusca Kraenzl. - Vanuatu, New Caledonia, Norfolk Island

References

External links 

US Department of Agriculture plants profile, Tropidia polystachya (Sw.) Ames young palm orchid
IOSPE orchid photos, Tropidia curculigoides Lindl. 1828 Photo by Copyright © Rogier Van Vugt 

 
Tropidieae genera